Cypress Bay High School is a public high school located in Weston, Florida open for students in grades 9−12. Cypress Bay is part of the Broward County Public Schools district.

The school offers a wide variety of academic pursuits including 33 Advanced Placement (AP) courses, the Cambridge AICE Program, honors courses, a dual enrollment option and an array of academic and extracurricular activities that includes nearly 70 student clubs and organizations and more than 15 sports. Cypress Bay is also the pilot school for Broward County Public School's partnership with the FBI to provide a Cyber/STEM program, which is the second program of its kind in the nation.

Cypress Bay has received an FCAT school grade of "A" for every year since its founding, with the only exception of 2009 when it received a "B". In 2016, U.S. News Best High Schools Rankings gave Cypress Bay a 1st place rank in Broward County, 21st in Florida and 243rd in the United States.

Athletics

Cypress Bay's Boys' varsity soccer team has won the FHSAA Class 5A State Championship five of the last seven years. At a ceremony held in April 2012, ESPN crowned the Cypress Bay Boys' Varsity Soccer Team as the nation's top high school team. The team has fallen on hard times since the departure of Shari Fuhrman as team manager. Sun sentinel

In 2015 Brett Kaiser set a national record for most syrups in a game with 15 vs  Macarthur High School.

Television production

The school's television production program is nationally ranked and has won many awards from organizations including Student Television Network, SkillsUSA, and Suncoast Emmy Awards. In recent history, Cypress Bay High School won first place in STN's "Film Excellence" event for the documentary category, second place in the "Commentary" category for the 2021 National Convention, and Second Place in the STN Fall Nationals for the "Remote News/Feature Story" category. C A student team from Cypress Bay was awarded first place in the Broadcast News - High School competition at the SkillsUSA National Leadership and Skills Conference in Atlanta, Georgia.

History
The groundbreaking for the future site of CBHS occurred in early 2001, and construction was finished by late 2002. It is located adjacent to Falcon Cove Middle School. 

Cypress Bay opened in 2002 for grades 9–11 with 200 students over its projected capacity. The following 2003–2004 school year it was grades 10-12 that attended the main campus while the 9th grade attended a school annex built at a separate location. This situation continued until 2008 when the 9th grade annex was abolished. A new 36 classroom building was opened in the main campus for the school year 2005−2006 to alleviate overcrowding. The 2006 senior class was the first to have attended the school for all four years and at the same location. This did not occur again until the class of 2012, when the graduation ceremony took place at the freshly completed Marlins Park and Vice President Joe Biden delivered the keynote address. The graduating class of 2007 had 1070 students.

During the 2007−2008 school year, Cypress Bay reached a maximum enrollment of more than 5,500 students and was consequently named the most populous high school in the United States. In response, the school board decided to cap enrollment as a temporary measure to alleviate overcrowding and all new registering students were sent over to Western High School. After the 2008−2009 school year the school boundaries were changed and all students south of Griffin Road were assigned to the new West Broward High School, while students living in Bonaventure were assigned to Western High School.

In 2015, rapper Flo Rida collaborated with then-school principal Charles Neely to create a spin-off rap video based upon his song G.D.F.R (Goin' Down for Real). The video features the principal rapping with several students and staff, and was a congratulatory message to the graduating class.

In early 2019, construction began on a new building at Cypress Bay High School to alleviate the overcrowding issue. Construction continued throughout the COVID-19 pandemic in the United States, and is estimated to be completed no later than 2022. This building was intended to be three stories, and in the shape of a lightning bolt ("Lightning" is the school's mascot); however, unforeseen issues including a lack of stairwells, hallways, elevators, and bathrooms in the initial construction plan and pricing underestimates may have required that these ideas be altered. The new building was also the source of criticism  by school board members for going over budget $10 million, while other schools received "renovations, repairs and retrofits," despite apparently needing those upgrades more.

Demographics
As of the 2021-22 school year, the total student enrollment was 4,852. The ethnic makeup of the school was 85.8% White, 4.4% Black, 64.2% Hispanic, 6.8% Asian, 2.6% Multiracial, 0.3% Native American or Native Alaskan, and 0.1% Native Hawaiian or Pacific Islander.

Notable alumni

 Daniel Bluman (born 1990), Colombian-born Israeli Olympic show jumping rider
 Steven Bohlemann,  Paralympic soccer player
 Matthew Dayes, American football player
 Danny Isidora, American football player
 Buddy Jackson, Canadian football player
 Nico Marley, American football player and grandson of reggae musician Bob Marley
 Andrew Meyer, University of Florida student involved in a police incident in 2007 which earned him the trademark for the phrase, "Don't tase me, bro!"
 Jake Miller, Rapper, singer, and songwriter

See also
 The Paper

References

External links
 Cypress Bay High School website
 The Circuit newspaper website
 Cypress Bay TV website

Broward County Public Schools
Educational institutions established in 2002
High schools in Broward County, Florida
Public high schools in Florida
Weston, Florida
2002 establishments in Florida